Barpathar High School is a coeducational Assamese Medium School established in 1989. It is affiliated with SEBA. It was one of the oldest venture School at Bongaigaon until 2012 and became provincialised in 2013. The school currently educated children up until year 10. It started with a minimal infrastructure of a one assam pattern building, classes from 1 to 5. Within a short span of time the school grew to have three assam type buildings, fully equipped science laboratory, computer laboratory and  a big playground.

References

High schools and secondary schools in Assam
Educational institutions established in 1989
1989 establishments in Assam